Paolo Lorenzi was the defending champion, but he was eliminated by Nikola Ćirić already in the first round.Due to rain, the final was played on Sunday, 26 September at 11:00 local time. Blaž Kavčič won this match 6–2, 4–6, 7–5, against David Goffin.

Seeds

Draw

Finals

Top half

Bottom half

References
Main Draw
Qualifying Singles

BMW Ljubljana Open - Singles
BMW Ljubljana Open